was a railway station in Ise, Mie Prefecture, Japan, operated by Central Japan Railway Company (JR Central). The station was 25.4 rail kilometers from the terminus of the Sangū Line at Taki Station. It was a seasonal station that was only open during parts of the summer.  At other times, no trains, not even locals, stopped at this station. On 14 March 2020, JR Central permanently closed the station, owing to low ridership over several years.

History
Ikenoura Seaside Station opened on July 16, 1989.

Lines
JR Central
Sangū Line

Station layout
Ikenoura Seaside Station consisted of one side platform serving bi-directional traffic. There was no station building, and the station was unattended.

Platforms

Adjacent stations 

|-

Surrounding area
Ikenoura beach

External links

Railway stations in Japan opened in 1989
Railway stations in Mie Prefecture